Charles Devine "Cuckoo" Jamieson (February 7, 1893 – October 27, 1969) was an American baseball player, an outfielder for the Washington Senators (1915–17), Philadelphia Athletics (1917–18) and Cleveland Indians (1919–32).

Professional career
Jamieson helped Cleveland win the 1920 American League pennant, batting .319 with 69 runs scored in 108 games. He went 5 for 15 with two runs scored in the 1920 World Series as the Indians beat the Brooklyn Robins. In 1921 he batted .310 with 94 runs scored, and in 1922 raised his average to .323 while leading the team with 183 hits. 1923 was an even better year for Jamieson, who led the American League with a career-high 222 hits while also setting personal bests in runs (130, 3rd best in the league), on-base percentage (.422), doubles (36), and triples (12) while batting .345. Jamieson hit a career-high .359 in 1924, second in the league behind Babe Ruth, while also finishing second in the league with 213 hits. He scored 98 runs and was 5th in the league with 21 stolen bases, finishing 6th in the MVP balloting. In 1925, his 109 runs scored were the 6th most in the league. Jamieson is the only outfielder who initiated triple plays twice in the same year. On May 23, 1928, his triple play helped the Indians defeat the Chicago White Sox, and he repeated the feat in a 7–3 loss to the New York Yankees on June 9.

He finished his career with a .303 batting average and 1,062 runs scored over 18 major league seasons. Jamieson topped the .300 mark 8 times.

See also

 List of Major League Baseball career runs scored leaders

References

External links

Charlie Jamieson - Baseballbiography.com

1893 births
1969 deaths
Major League Baseball outfielders
Washington Senators (1901–1960) players
Philadelphia Athletics players
Cleveland Indians players
Baseball players from Paterson, New Jersey
Buffalo Bisons (minor league) players
Jersey City Skeeters players